The 2015 Pirelli World Challenge season was the 26th running of the Sports Car Club of America's World Challenge series. It introduced a new all-Porsche "GT Cup" race group. Johnny O'Connell was the defending champion in the highest class, the GT class.

Schedule

The season comprises 12 rounds, with several rounds in support of the IndyCar Series and the United SportsCar Championship, as well as supporting the NASCAR Canadian Tire Series and the NASCAR Xfinity Series.

†The round at Long Beach was capped to 40 cars, with only 10 GT-Cup cars guaranteed a place. Any GT-Cup entries that were not able to contest the Long Beach round were eligible for double points at Barber Motorsports Park.

News

The second race at Belle Isle on May 31 was cancelled on safety grounds due to inclement weather, which caused reduced track visibility. An additional race was held at Road America to replace the round at Detroit.

Entry list

GT/GTA

GT Cup

Every driver participates in a Porsche 911 GT3 Cup.

GTS

TC/TCA/TCB

Race results

Notes

Championship standings

Drivers' Championships
Championship points were awarded to drivers based on qualifying and finishing positions. The driver had to complete at least 50% of the class winner's number of laps to receive points. The Pole position winner received 7 points. In addition, 1 bonus point was awarded to a driver leading a lap during a race, and 3 bonus points were awarded to the driver leading the most laps. The driver who set the fastest lap of the race received 1 bonus point.

GT

Notes
 Results denoted by † did not complete sufficient laps in order to score points.

GTA
Michael Lewis ran in the GTA class during the first three events of the championship, but ran in the GT class from Barber on. Bryan Heitkotter ran in the GTA class during the first eight events of the championship, but ran in the GT class from Miller on. Those who finished behind Lewis and Heitkotter in the GTA class in the first eight events did not get more points despite the fact that Lewis and Heitkotter have been removed from the GTA standings.

Notes
 Results denoted by † did not complete sufficient laps in order to score points.

GT Cup
Every driver competes in a Porsche 911 GT3 Cup.

Notes
 Results denoted by † did not complete sufficient laps in order to score points.

GTS

Notes
 Results denoted by † did not complete sufficient laps in order to score points.

TC

Notes
 Results denoted by † did not complete sufficient laps in order to score points.

TCA

Notes
 Results denoted by † did not complete sufficient laps in order to score points.
1 – Kris Wright was put in last place of the TCA class for an issue in post tech after Race 1 at Austin.

TCB

Notes
 Results denoted by † did not complete sufficient laps in order to score points.
1 – Andrei Kisel was put in last place of the TCB class for driving conduct after Race 1 at Austin.

Manufacturers' Championships
Only those manufacturers who are SCCA Pro Racing corporate members were eligible to receive points toward the Manufacturers' Championship. Championship points were awarded to manufacturers based on qualifying and finishing positions. Only the highest finishing car of each eligible manufacturer earned points for its finishing position. The Pole position winner received 1 bonus point.

GT

Notes
 Results denoted by † did not complete sufficient laps in order to score points.

GTS

Notes
 Results denoted by † did not complete sufficient laps in order to score points.

TC

Notes
 Results denoted by † did not complete sufficient laps in order to score points.

TCA

Notes
 Results denoted by † did not complete sufficient laps in order to score points.

References

Pirelli World Challenge
GT World Challenge America